Church Pew with Worshippers is a watercolor created in September-October 1882 by Vincent van Gogh. A sketch of the painting was included in a letter van Gogh sent to his brother Theo that mentions the work.

See also 
 Early works of Vincent van Gogh
 List of drawings by Vincent van Gogh

References 

Paintings by Vincent van Gogh
1882 paintings
Paintings in the Netherlands
Churches in art